Nggarna (Ngar), or Sota (Sota Kanum), is a Yam language of in the village of Sota in western Morehead Rural LLG, Western Province, Papua New Guinea. Despite identifying as Kanum, the language is closer to Rema across the border in Indonesia than it is to other Kanum languages of Papua New Guinea.

References

Tonda languages
Languages of Western Province (Papua New Guinea)